Opaline is the third studio album by Dishwalla, released on April 23, 2002 on Immergent Records.

Track listing
 "Opaline" - 04:10
 "Angels or Devils" - 04:03
 "Somewhere in the Middle" - 03:42
 "Every Little Thing" - 04:26
 "When Morning Comes" - 03:59
 "Home" - 04:52
 "Today, Tonight" - 03:02
 "Mad Life" - 03:54
 "Candleburn" - 04:01
 "Nashville Skyline" - 04:40
 "Drawn Out" - 04:01

Musicians

Scot Alexander – bass
Rodney Cravens – guitars
Pete Maloney – drums, percussion
J.R. Richards – vocals, guitar, keyboards
Jim Woods – keyboards, programming

References

2002 albums
Dishwalla albums